The 1998 Nordic Figure Skating Championships were held from February 27th through March 1st, 1998 in Helsinki, Finland. The competition was open to elite figure skaters from Nordic countries. Skaters competed in two disciplines, men's singles and ladies' singles, across two levels: senior (Olympic-level) and junior.

Senior results

Men

Ladies

Junior results

Men

Ladies

References

External links
 results

Nordic Figure Skating Championships, 1998
Nordic Figure Skating Championships, 1998
Nordic Figure Skating Championships
International figure skating competitions hosted by Finland
International sports competitions in Helsinki